ATP-dependent DNA helicase Q1 is an enzyme that in humans is encoded by the RECQL gene.

The protein encoded by this gene is a member of the RecQ DNA helicase family. DNA helicases are enzymes involved in various types of DNA repair, including mismatch repair, nucleotide excision repair and direct repair. Some members of this family are associated with genetic disorders with predisposition to malignancy and chromosomal instability. The biological function of this helicase has not yet been determined. Two alternatively spliced transcripts, which encode the same isoform but differ in their 5' and 3' UTRs, have been described.

Interactions
RECQL has been shown to interact with KPNA4 and Karyopherin alpha 2.

References

Further reading